Microcolona autotypa is a moth in the family Elachistidae. It is found in southern India.

The wingspan is about 11 mm. The forewings are grey, the tips of the scales minutely ochreous-whitish, forming a very fine transverse striation and a tuft beneath the fold at one-fourth. The stigmata is blackish, accompanied by tufts. The hindwings are grey.

References

Moths described in 1922
Microcolona
Moths of Asia